Wealth Against Commonwealth is a book published by muckraking journalist Henry Demarest Lloyd. It was published after he had written several essays to The Atlantic Monthly concerning issues with dominating monopolies. It was written in an effort to expose the wrongdoings mainly of the monopoly Standard Oil but also discusses others. It contributed significantly to further rallying the Progressive Movement in the early twentieth century.

External Links 
 Wealth Against Commonwealth at Internet Archive

References

English-language books
1894 non-fiction books
American political books
Books critical of capitalism